Acalypha pittieri is a species of flowering plant in the family Euphorbiaceae, native to the Central American Pacific Islands, found in the north of Cocos Island.

References

pittieri
Flora of the Central American Pacific Islands
Plants described in 1924